Práxedes Mariano Mateo Sagasta y Escolar (21 July 1825 – 5 January 1903) was a Spanish civil engineer and politician who served as Prime Minister on eight occasions between 1870 and 1902—always in charge of the Liberal Party—as part of the turno pacifico, alternating with the Conservative leader Antonio Cánovas. He was known as an excellent orator.

Biography 
Mateo-Sagasta was born on 21 July 1825 at Torrecilla en Cameros, province of Logroño, Spain. As a member of the Progressive Party while a student at the Civil Engineering School of Madrid in 1848, Sagasta was the only one in the school who refused to sign a letter supporting Queen Isabel II.

After his studies, he took an active role in government. Sagasta served in the Spanish Cortes between 1854–1857 and 1858–1863. In 1866 he went into exile in France after a failed coup. After the Spanish Revolution of 1868, he returned to Spain to take part in the newly-created provisional government.

He served as Prime Minister of Spain during the Spanish–American War of 1898 when Spain lost its remaining colonies. Sagasta agreed to an autonomous constitution for both Cuba and Puerto Rico. Sagasta's political opponents saw his action as a betrayal of Spain and blamed him for the country's defeat in the war and the loss of its island territories in the Treaty of Paris of 1898. He continued to be active in politics for another four years.

Sagasta′s ministry lost a vote in the Cortes on 2 December 1902, he handed in his resignation to the King on the following day, and formally resigned on 10 December 1902.

Sagasta died just a month after his last resignation, on 5 January 1903 in Madrid at the age of 77.

References

External links
 U.S. Library of Congress Profile

|-

|-

|-

|-

|-

|-

1825 births
1903 deaths
Politicians from La Rioja
Progressive Party (Spain) politicians
Constitutional Party (Spain) politicians
Liberal Party (Spain, 1880) politicians
Prime Ministers of Spain
Economy and finance ministers of Spain
Presidents of the Congress of Deputies (Spain)
Members of the Congress of Deputies (Spain)
Members of the Congress of Deputies of the Spanish Restoration
Leaders of political parties in Spain
Spanish civil engineers
Spanish people of the Spanish–American War
Polytechnic University of Madrid alumni
Knights of the Golden Fleece of Spain
Knights of the Holy Sepulchre
Government ministers during the First Spanish Republic
Spanish political party founders